Mansurchak Block is one of the eighteen Blocks of Begusarai District of Bihar state, India.  As per the government register, the block number of Mansurchak is 297. The block has 41 villages and one town of Mansurchak. It is the headquarters of Begusarai District.It is a part of Darbhanga Division.

Geography
Mansurchak block is a city situated in Begusarai district of Bihar which falls in India. The geographical coordinates i.e. latitude and longitude of Mansurchak is 25.631262 and 85.907322 respectively. Mansurchak observes Indian Standard Time. The currency code for Indian rupee is INR. The currency used in Mansurchak block is Indian rupee.

Demographics

Transport

Roadways 
Mansurchak block is connected by road. This town is situated on Dalsinghsarai to zero mile-malti road which links zero mile to city of Dalsinghsarai, Samastipur. It is also connected to Bachwara NH-28.

Railways 
Bachwara Jn railway station is the nearest railway station from Mansurchak. The straight line distance from Mansurchak to Bachwara Jn railway station is 5.3 kilometers. The nearest railway station and its distance from Mansurchak are:

 Bachwara Jn railway station	5.3 km
 Sathajagat railway station	5.4 km
 Dalsingh Sarai railway station	9.1 km

Climate
It is hot in summer. Mansurchak block summer highest day temperature is between 29°C to 45°C .
The average temperature in January is 16°C .
February is 20°C.
March is 27°C.
April is 32°C.
May is 36°C.
June is 39°C.

Education 
D. B. M. Inter College was established in 1981 and it is managed by the Department of Education. The school is taught in Hindi and consists of grades 11 and 12. The school is co-educational and does not have an attached pre-primary section.[]
 
10+2 high school

N N Shina 10+2

10+2 SBD Girls Higher Secondary School

T P C High School Nayatol Agapur

Ahiapur High School

CBSE Pattern

Modern Public School

S D M Public School

Udaan the 7 habits Foundation School

Career Public School

Raj Public School Kastoli

Hospital

Mansoorchak Charitable Dispensry

Mansurchak Charitable Dispensary is the second largest government hospital in the Begusarai district by number of patients who come for treatment and delivery.

Nayatol Government Hospital

Bank
UCO Bank

Bihar Gramin Bank

SBI Grahak Seva

Village

Politics
Mansurchak block comes under the Bachwara assembly constituency. The major political parties in this area are:
Indian National Congress
Janata Dal (United)
Lok Janshakti Party
Rashtriya Janata Dal
Bharatiya Janata Party
Communist Party of India
Communist Party of India (Marxist)

References

Community development blocks in Bihar